Saidou Khan (born 5 December 1995) is a Gambian professional footballer who plays for English club Swindon Town as a midfielder.

Early and personal life
Khan grew up in Sanchaba in The Gambia; his father worked a soldier on a peacekeeping mission in Liberia, and later moved to London to work as a security guard. Khan grew up "obsessed" with football; his favourite player was AC Milan's Kaká, and he is nicknamed 'Kaka' in The Gambia. Khan's father died of cancer when Khan was 12 years old. Khan moved to England in 2010, two years after his father's death.

Career
Khan spent his early career in English non-league football with Tooting & Mitcham United, Dulwich Hamlet, Carshalton Athletic, Chipstead and Kingstonian. During this time Khan studied at the University of East London and worked part-time at a Lidl supermarket. He later played in the National League South with Maidstone United, and the National League with Dagenham & Redbridge. He also has two unsuccessful trials with Football League club Milton Keynes Dons; he nearly quit football after his second rejection.

He signed for National League club Chesterfield in July 2021, on a two-year contract. By November 2021 he was the club's joint-top scorer that season. The club rejected a transfer bid for Khan in January 2022. He signed for Swindon Town for an undisclosed fee in July 2022.'

Career statistics

References

1995 births
Living people
Gambian footballers
Tooting & Mitcham United F.C. players
Dulwich Hamlet F.C. players
Carshalton Athletic F.C. players
Chipstead F.C. players
Kingstonian F.C. players
Maidstone United F.C. players
Dagenham & Redbridge F.C. players
Chesterfield F.C. players
Swindon Town F.C. players
National League (English football) players
Association football midfielders
English Football League players
Isthmian League players